Berchem is a small town in the commune of Roeser, in southern Luxembourg.  , the town has a population of 892.

It is notable for being the nearest settlement to one of the world's largest retail petrol stations.

Roeser
Towns in Luxembourg